Foster Pirie (Babe) Ganzel (May 22, 1901 – February 6, 1978) was an outfielder who played baseball for the Washington Senators from 1927 to 1928.  He batted left handed and threw right-handed.

A native of Malden, Massachusetts, Ganzel came from a family of baseball men.  His father, Charlie, was a catcher who played with the Whitecaps, Quakers, Wolverines and Beaneaters during 14 seasons, and his uncle John was a first baseman for the Pirates, Cubs, Giants, Highlanders and Reds and also managed the Reds and the Tip-Tops.  Two brothers and two uncles also played in the minor leagues.

In a two-season career, Ganzel posted a .311 batting average with one home run and 17 RBI in 23 games played.

Following his majors career, Ganzel played in the high minors for nine years.  Then he turned to managing and directing the Selma, St. Paul and Jacksonville Triple-A teams.

Ganzel died in Jacksonville, Florida, at the age of 76.

See also
List of second-generation Major League Baseball players

External links
Baseball Almanac
Baseball Reference
The Deadball Era

1901 births
1978 deaths
Washington Senators (1901–1960) players
Major League Baseball outfielders
Baseball players from Massachusetts
Sportspeople from Malden, Massachusetts
Minor league baseball managers
St. Paul Saints (AA) managers
Evansville Evas players
Birmingham Barons players
Louisville Colonels (minor league) players
Minneapolis Millers (baseball) players
Jacksonville Tars players
Selma Cloverleafs players
Gadsden Pilots players